Voluntary return or voluntary repatriation is usually the return of an illegal immigrant or over-stayer, a rejected asylum seeker, a refugee or displaced person, or an unaccompanied minor; sometimes it is the emigration of a second-generation immigrant who makes an autonomous decision to return to their ethnic homeland when they are unable or unwilling to remain in the host country.

Overview
The terms are used in slightly different contexts and can refer to:
 The voluntary return of asylum seekers who no longer want to wait for a decision on their asylum application or who have changed their mind about the application and rather want to go back to their country of origin.
 Destitute migrants, such as homeless people, who cannot afford the journey back home. Some homelessness charities provide funding for these journeys.
 The "voluntary" return of rejected asylum seekers or irregular migrants to their countries of origin. Leaving voluntarily in this context can be somewhat euphemistic, as the alternative is often immigration detention and eventual deportation.
 The most preferred of the UNHCR's three durable solutions for refugees because it is what most  refugees seek. Once the reasons for being displaced or having fled have disappeared and it is safe again to live in this country refugees are free to go back to their country of origin. The so-called returnees are still people of concern to the UNHCR and are, as such, under their legal protection. The UNHCR is monitoring returnee operations and offers support to returnees even after they have arrived in their countries of origin.

Some voluntary return programmes offer assisted voluntary return (AVR) and some voluntary return is spontaneous and independent without assistance.

Voluntary return of refugees

Legal basis
The concept of voluntary repatriation was first developed in the 1969 Convention Governing the Specific Aspects of Refugee Problems in Africa. It was agreed that:

"The sending state, in collaboration with the receiving state, must make adequate arrangements for the safe return of refugees who request repatriation, while the country of origin must facilitate their resettlement and grant them the full rights and privileges of nationals of the country, and subject them to the same obligations."

Controversies
 The UNHCR and the hosting countries usually encourage the refugees to return voluntarily. The 1969 Refugee Convention expects states of origin to advertise repatriation, by using the news and media as well as Organisation of African Unity, in order to invite refugees back home. Equally the host countries are expected to spread such information and to ensure it is received. However, the information that is spread about the improved and safer situation in the country of origin may be exaggerated, blurred or untrue and refugees may be encouraged to return home before the dangers and risks are fully removed.
 As refugees are protected from deportation (or refoulement) by the 1951 Refugee Convention, some host countries may indirectly force them to leave by gradually decreasing refugees' living standards and living conditions or by spreading lies about them to make them feel less welcome. This is similar to self-deportation.
 In some countries, the IOM's programmes of "voluntary assisted returns" have been criticized. The "voluntary" nature of these returns, put forward in the media coverage of IOM interventions is considered as questionable, for instance in Libya. According to the UNHCR, for whom "voluntariness is more than an issue of principle", if people's rights "are not recognized, if they are subject to pressures and restrictions and confined to closed camps, they may choose to return, but this is not an act of free will".
 Some countries offer financial support to refugees and rejected asylum seekers in order to facilitate the process of starting a new life in their country of origin. This could be considered as residency buyouts.

Support offered
The UNHCR and the IOM offer assistance to refugees who want to return voluntarily and to other people in need of support for returning to their home countries. This includes administrative, logistical, financial and reintegration support. Many developed countries also provide assistance and voluntary return programmes independent from the IOM and the UNHCR. Support includes making travel arrangements and paying for the journey. Support may also include financial support so that returnees can make sustainable investments and can build their lives again. Connecting people with networks and groups in the country of origin so that they will get support from local organisations.

When one takes part in assisted voluntary return programs (AVR), the applicant is giving up their claim as a refugee or asylum-seeker. Many times this includes a five-year travel ban restricting the individual from returning to the host country, similar to deportation. According to interviews with IOM workers and files on return migrants who took part in their program, it is not uncommon for return migrants to feel pressured into applying to AVR programs due to financial hardships, lack of employment, fear of deportation, etc.

Government policies and incentives

Europe
 – Return and Emigration of Asylum Seekers Ex Belgium programme: This program is open to asylum seekers and third-country nationals who want to return to their country of origin or to voluntarily emigrate to a third world country. As this program is voluntary, one can retract their application if ever they change their mind. Applicants are offered travel support, including counselling prior to departure, assistance during their flight and travel cost. Applicants are also offered some monetary compensation to get them to their home from the airport. Financial support is also offered to aid in the reintegration process, partially funded by the European Return Fund.

 – with a history of financially incentivising the voluntary return of immigrants, Denmark raised the amount to 100,000 kroner per person (around €13,000 EUR or US$20,000) in 2009. Peter Skaarup, deputy leader of the Danish People's Party, explained the scheme was aimed at immigrants from outside the EU and non-Nordic nations, targeting "nationals from non-Western countries who are struggling to adapt to Danish society". The Danish government also allocated 20 million kroner for city councils, to "motivate foreigners to return home".

 – from 2005 around 3,000 immigrant families were paid to voluntarily leave France. By 2007, under newly elected President Nicolas Sarkozy, the French government started an enhanced scheme offering €6,000 per immigrant family to return to their country of origin. Brice Hortefeux, Immigration Minister, stated that France "must increase this measure to help voluntary return". In 2016, in response to the European migrant crisis, the government had rapidly risen the offer from €350 to €2,500 per individual. In 2017, Interior Minister Gerard Collomb reconfirmed the commitment to raise the monetary offer for immigrants to leave France.

 – with 35,000 voluntary returns in 2015, Germany allocated an extra €150 million over three years for migrants willing to return to their homelands.  The policy saw an increase to 55,000 repatriations in the first year. In February 2017, under the 'Starthilfe Plus' scheme, immigrants were offered up to €1,000 each, or €3,000 to families,  to leave the country and withdraw applications for asylum or residency. As of October 2017, 8,639 immigrants had returned home via the government program. In December 2017, under the slogan "Your country. Your future. Now!", the German government began offering grants for new kitchens and bathrooms, as well as one year's worth of paid rent, in the country of origin of an immigrant choosing to return home.

 – in 2009, the Republic of Ireland government began offering repatriations grants to immigrants from nations outside the European Union to return home. The move was motivated by the Irish economic recession, with the EU-funded project attempting to "persuade foreign workers and asylum seekers to return to their country of origin".

 – in 2013, the Italian government offered African migrants, mainly from Ghana, Libya and Togo, up to €500 to leave the country and travel onwards to Germany, France or northern European nations. Detlef Scheele, Hamburgs social affairs minister, dealing with multiple arrivals from Italy, declared that the immigrants had "no legal right to stay" and would return to Italy or back to their home countries.

 – in 2016 the Norwegian government offered the first 500 asylum seekers to take a 10,000 kroner "bonus" to leave the country voluntarily, in addition to the 20,000 kroner already offered per person. Sylvi Listhaug, Integration Minister of Norway, claimed the move might "entice" immigrants to "voluntarily travel back by giving them a bit more money on their way out".

 – in 2008, struggling from recession and with unemployment towards 30%, the Spanish government proposed a 'Voluntary Return Plan'. Mainly targeting immigrants from South America, the Spanish labour ministry identified around 100,000 individuals from 19 countries which would be eligible for the scheme. In 2011, Anna Terrón, Secretary of State for Immigration, claimed the scheme "helps everyone if those who want to return to their country of origin are able to."

 – in August 2007, the Swedish government began offering asylum seekers who were rejected permanent residency the equivalent of £3,500 per immigrant for a voluntary return to their country of origin. This resulted in a record 4,542 immigrants taking part in the scheme, and returning home in the first 8 months of 2016.

 – the Swiss government, following in the footsteps of Denmark, began a policy of confiscating any property of illegal immigrants with a value over 1,000 Swiss francs. However, the 2016 policy included an incentive for migrants to return to their country of origin, with the SEM stating that "if someone leaves voluntarily within seven months this person can get the money back and take it with them."

 – in 2006, asylum seekers and illegal immigrants were offered up to £3,000 per individual to leave the country. Job training, education as well as travel costs were included in the scheme, with an expected uptake of 3,000 people, costing the British taxpayer an estimated £6.2 million. By 2010, the annual cost had risen to £16 million, with Immigration Minister Damian Green announcing a reduction from the 5-year delay on re-entry applications, to further incentivise quick voluntary repatriations.
Assisted Voluntary Return for Families and Children: This program is open to non-European people with children and lone migrant children. They are given a cash grant of £500 to relocate and £2,000 to reintegrate to their communities per person. One can apply to this scheme before their asylum claim has been rejected.
Assisted Voluntary Return of Irregular Migrants: This program provides help to illegal immigrants and immigrants who have overstayed to return to their country of origin. They are not offered monetary assistance.
Facilitated Returns Scheme: This aids foreign national prisoners, once they have completed their sentence they are given £500 cash and a reintegration package of £3,000. If they leave before the end of their sentence they can receive  up to £2,000 more.
Positive Futures Project: This project is offered to young unaccompanied adults. After applying to an assisted voluntary return program, they can receive training to develop skills and gain additional education to help them build a home and have a career in the country they are returning to.
Voluntary Assisted Return and Reintegration Programme: One can receive maximum £1,500 per person relocating to their home country. This program aids applicants with travel documents and booking flight.

North America
 – the Canadian government opted to not renew their 'Assisted Voluntary Return and Reintegration' pilot program in early 2015, after an evaluation by the Canada Border Services Agency. The program sought to reduce the number of failed asylum appeals and incentivize voluntarily leaving the country, but didn't achieve all its objectives.

 – in 2018, the American government announced the end of temporary protected status (TPS) for 200,000 Salvadoran immigrants. The decision, implemented by President Donald Trump, gave an 18-month period for immigrants to find a legal route to staying in the U.S. or to return to their country of origin. The termination of TPS comes into effect on September 9, 2019, granting immigrants a grace period for voluntarily repatriation, before facing deportation beyond that date.

Rest of world
 – the Israeli government withhold 20 percent of asylum seekers' wages, in an attempt to encourage individuals to leave the country, where they will have access to the funds upon return to their homeland. The scheme was launched from May 2016, and currently applies to asylum seekers from Sudan and Eritrea.

 – after the 2008 recession, Japan initiated a policy of paying unemployed workers to leave the country, mainly targeting the Latin American Dekasegi population for voluntary return. The incentivised scheme offered $3,000 (USD), plus $2,000 per dependent, and came with additional clauses that children of the returnee (second-generation immigrants) would not be able to later emigrate to Japan regardless of circumstance.

UNHCR refugee return statistics

Voluntary return of other migrants

Voluntary return statistics

References

Freedom of movement
Refugees
Repatriation